Frank Hood Lee (March 29, 1873 – November 20, 1952) was a U.S. Representative from Missouri.

Born on a farm near De Soto, Kansas, Lee moved to Missouri with his parents (Daniel Marion & Lucy [Howard] Lee, who settled near Virgil City in Vernon County in 1876. He attended the public schools of Virgil City and studied law.

He served as Justice of the Peace in 1894. He was admitted to the bar in 1904 and commenced practice in Joplin, Missouri. He served as a member of the Missouri House of Representatives for two terms, 1915-1918.

Congress
Lee was an unsuccessful candidate for election in 1922 to the Sixty-eighth Congress and in 1930 to the Seventy-second Congress. He was elected as a Democrat to the Seventy-third Congress (March 4, 1933 – January 3, 1935). He was an unsuccessful candidate for reelection in 1934 to the Seventy-fourth Congress.

After Congress
He resumed the practice of law until his retirement. He owned and operated The Southwestern, a Jasper County newspaper, and the Jefferson Hotel. He died in Joplin, Missouri on November 20, 1952, and was interred in Ozark Memorial Park.

References

1873 births
1952 deaths
People from De Soto, Kansas
People from Vernon County, Missouri
Democratic Party members of the Missouri House of Representatives
Democratic Party members of the United States House of Representatives from Missouri